"A Life on the Ocean Wave" is a poem-turned-song by Epes Sargent published in 1838 and set to music by Henry Russell. It is the iconic Regimental March of His Majesty's Royal Marines.

Origin of the poem and song
One day Sargent was walking on The Battery in New York City watching the ships enter the harbour. This scene inspired Sargent to write a poem, which Russell later put to music. The song soon became popular in both the United Kingdom and the United States.

Lyrics

History of cultural uses of the song
At an 1851 celebration in Salem, Massachusetts, the Boston Cadet Band gave the new clipper ship Witch of the Wave a lively sendoff by striking up "A Life on the Ocean Wave" as the SS R. B. Forbes towed the new clipper out to set sail for Boston.

The tune, slightly altered, provides the music for the Latter-day Saint hymn "Who's On The Lord's Side?"

References

External links

 Thurl Ravenscroft-- Life On The Ocean Waves, Video with music and pictures
 A Life on the Ocean Wave, Sound clip and links to sheet music, as featured in the Laura Ingalls Wilder book By the Shores of Silver Lake

British military marches
Royal Marines
Royal Marines Band Service
1838 songs
Songs with music by Henry Russell (musician)
Songs based on poems